Souto Maior may refer to:

 Souto Maior (Sabrosa), a civil parish in Sabrosa Municipality, Portugal
 Souto Maior (Trancoso), a civil parish in Trancoso Municipality, Portugal

See also
Sotomayor